Table Rock is a populated place and census-designated place (CDP) north of Gettysburg, Pennsylvania, United States, in Adams County, that was the site of an 1885 Gettysburg and Harrisburg Railroad station. As of the 2020 census the population was 133.

References

Census-designated places in Pennsylvania
Census-designated places in Adams County, Pennsylvania